Thomas or Tom Kean may refer to:

Thomas Kean (born 1935), former Governor of New Jersey, president of Drew University, and head of the 9/11 Commission
Thomas Kean Jr. (born 1968), U.S. Representative from New Jersey, former New Jersey State Senator and 2006 candidate for the U.S. Senate

See also
Tom Keane (1926–2001), American football player
Thomas Keane (disambiguation)
Tom Keene (disambiguation)